Australia competed at the 2018 Winter Olympics in Pyeongchang, South Korea, from 9 to 25 February 2018, with 50 competitors in 10 sports. They won three medals in total, two silver and one bronze, ranking 23rd in the medal table.

Medalists

Competitors
The following is the list of number of competitors participating at the Games per sport/discipline. A team of 45 athletes (including Russell Henshaw and Belle Brockhoff, subject to medical clearance) was announced by the Australian Olympic Committee on 25 January 2018. A further five athletes were added on 26 January 2018 after the reallocation of quota spots was finalised. Rohan Chapman-Davies was added to the team on 29 January after Russia handed back their men's quota place in mogul skiing.

Alpine skiing

Bobsleigh 

* – Denotes the driver of each sled

Cross-country skiing

Distance

Sprint

Figure skating 

Australia qualified one male figure skater, based on its placement at the 2017 World Figure Skating Championships in Helsinki, Finland.  They additionally qualified one female skater as well as an entry in pairs skating through the 2017 CS Nebelhorn Trophy.

Freestyle skiing

Aerials

Moguls

Ski cross

Slopestyle

Luge 

Based on the results from the World Cups during the 2017–18 Luge World Cup season, Australia qualified 1 sled.

Short track speed skating

Skeleton 
Australia the qualified a male and female athlete in the skeleton discipline. John Farrow, who had previously represented Australia in the 2014 Olympic Games, retired after competing in the 2018 Olympics.

Snowboarding

Freestyle

Tess Coady selected in team but did not compete due to injury in training prior to the competition.

Snowboard cross

Speed skating

See also
Australia at the 2017 Asian Winter Games
Australia at the 2018 Commonwealth Games
Australia at the 2018 Winter Paralympics

References

External links
Australian Olympic Committee 2018 Winter Olympics site

Nations at the 2018 Winter Olympics
2018
Winter Olympics